The Xiongnu were a tribal confederation of nomadic peoples who, according to ancient Chinese sources, inhabited the eastern Eurasian Steppe from the 3rd century BC to the late 1st century AD. Modu Chanyu, the supreme leader after 209 BC, founded the Xiongnu Empire.

After overthrowing their previous overlords, the Yuezhi, the Xiongnu became the dominant power on the steppes of East Asia, centred on the Mongolian Plateau. The Xiongnu were also active in areas now part of Siberia, Inner Mongolia, Gansu and Xinjiang. Their relations with adjacent Chinese dynasties to the south-east were complex—alternating between various periods of peace, war, and subjugation. Ultimately, the Xiongnu were defeated by the Han dynasty in a centuries-long conflict, which led to the confederation splitting in two, and forcible resettlement of large numbers of Xiongnu within Han borders. During the Sixteen Kingdoms era, as one of the "Five Barbarians", they founded several dynastic states in northern China, such as the Former Zhao and Hu Xia.

Attempts to identify the Xiongnu with the nearby Scythians and Sarmatians were once controversial, however archaeogenetics has confirmed their interaction with the Xiongnu, and also their relation to the Huns. The identity of the ethnic core of Xiongnu has been a subject of varied hypotheses, because only a few words, mainly titles and personal names, were preserved in the Chinese sources. The name Xiongnu may be cognate with that of the Huns and/or the Huna, although this is disputed. Other linguistic links—all of them also controversial—proposed by scholars include Iranian, Mongolic, Turkic, Uralic, Yeniseian, or multi-ethnic.

Name
The Chinese name for the Xiongnu was a pejorative term in itself, as the characters (匈奴) have the meaning of "fierce slave". The pronunciation of 匈奴 as Xiōngnú   is the modern Mandarin Chinese pronunciation, from the Mandarin dialect spoken now in Beijing, which came into existence less than 1,000 years ago. The Old Chinese pronunciation has been reconstructed as *xiuoŋ-na or *qhoŋna. Sinologist Axel Schuessler (2014) reconstructs the pronunciations of 匈奴 as *hoŋ-nâ in Late Old Chinese (c. 318 BCE) and as *hɨoŋ-nɑ in Eastern Han Chinese; citing other Chinese transcriptions wherein the velar nasal medial -ŋ-, after a short vowel, seemingly played the role of a general nasal - sometimes equivalent to n & m -, Schuessler proposes that  匈奴 Xiongnu < *hɨoŋ-nɑ < *hoŋ-nâ might be a Chinese rendition, Han or even pre-Han, of foreign *Hŏna or *Hŭna, which Schuessler compares to Huns and Sanskrit Hūṇā. However, the same medial -ŋ- prompts Christopher P. Atwood (2015) to reconstruct *Xoŋai, which he derives from the Ongi River in Mongolia and suggests that it was originally a dynastic name rather than an ethnic name.

History

Nomadic predecessors

The territories associated with the Xiongnu in central/east Mongolia were previously inhabited by the Slab Grave Culture, which persisted until the 3rd century BC. Genetic research indicates that the Slab Grave people were the primary ancestors of the Xiongnu, and that the Xiongnu formed through substantial and complex admixture with West Eurasians.

To the west, the Pazyryk culture (6th-3rd century BC) immediately preceded the formation of the Xiongnus. A Scythian culture, it was identified by excavated artifacts and mummified humans, such as the Siberian Ice Princess, found in the Siberian permafrost, in the Altay Mountains, Kazakhstan and nearby Mongolia. To the south, the Ordos culture had developed in the Ordos Loop (modern Inner Mongolia, China) during the Bronze and early Iron Age from the 6th to 2nd centuries BC, and is of unknown ethno-linguistic origin, and is thought to represent the easternmost extension of Indo-European-speakers. The Yuezhi were displaced by the Xiongnu expansion in the 2nd century BC, and had to migrate to Central and Southern Asia.

Early history 

Western Han historian Sima Qian composed an early yet detailed exposition on the Xiongnu in one liezhuan (arrayed account) of his Records of the Grand Historian ( BC), wherein the Xiongnu were alleged to be descendants of a certain Chunwei, who in turn descended from the "lineage of Lord Xia", a.k.a. Yu the Great. Even so, Sima Qian also drew a distinct line between the settled Huaxia people (Han) to the pastoral nomads (Xiongnu), characterizing them as two polar groups in the sense of a civilization versus an uncivilized society: the Hua–Yi distinction. Sima Qian also mentioned Xiongnu's early appearance north of Wild Goose Gate and Dai commanderies before 265 BCE, just before the Zhao-Xiongnu War; however, sinologist Edwin Pulleyblank (1994) contends that pre-241-BCE references to the Xiongnu are anachronistic substitutions for the Hu people instead. Sometimes the Xiongnu were distinguished from other nomadic peoples; namely, the Hu people; yet on other occasions, Chinese sources often just classified the Xiongnu as a Hu people, which was a blanket term for nomadic people. Even Sima Qian is inconsistent in his Historical Records: occasionally, he considered the Donghu to be the Hu proper, yet elsewhere he considered Xiongnu to be also Hu.

Ancient China often came in contact with the Xianyun and the Xirong nomadic peoples. In later Chinese historiography, some groups of these peoples were believed to be the possible progenitors of the Xiongnu people. These nomadic people often had repeated military confrontations with the Shang and especially the Zhou, who often conquered and enslaved the nomads in an expansion drift. During the Warring States period, the armies from the Qin, Zhao and Yan states were encroaching and conquering various nomadic territories that were inhabited by the Xiongnu and other Hu peoples. The Zhao–Xiongnu War is a notable example of these campaigns.

Pulleyblank argued that the Xiongnu were part of a Xirong group called Yiqu, who had lived in Shaanbei and had been influenced by China for centuries, before they were driven out by the Qin dynasty. Qin's campaign against the Xiongnu expanded Qin's territory at the expense of the Xiongnu. After the unification of Qin dynasty, Xiongnu was a threat to the northern board of Qin. They were likely to attack the Qin dynasty when they suffered natural disasters.

State formation 
The first known Xiongnu leader was Touman, who reigned between 220-209 BC. In 215 BC, Chinese Emperor Qin Shi Huang sent General Meng Tian on a military campaign against the Xiongnu. Meng Tian defeated the Xiongnu and expelled them from the Ordos loop, forcing Touman and the Xiongnu to flee north into the Mongolian Plateau. In 210 BC, Meng Tian died, and in 209 BC, Touman's son Modu became the Xiongnu Chanyu.

In order to protect the Xiongnu from the threat of the Qin dynasty, Modu Chanyu united the Xiongnu into a powerful confederation. This transformed the Xiongnu into a more formidable polity, able to form larger armies and exercise improved strategic coordination. Two years later, in 207 BC, the Qin dynasty fell, and after a period of internal conflict, it was replaced by the Western Han dynasty in 202 BC. This period of Chinese instability was a time of prosperity for the Xiongnu, who adopted many Han agriculture techniques such as slaves for heavy labor and lived in Han-style homes. 

After forging internal unity, Modu Chanyu expanded the Xiongnu empire in all directions. To the north he conquered a number of nomadic peoples, including the Dingling of southern Siberia. He crushed the power of the Donghu people of eastern Mongolia and Manchuria as well as the Yuezhi in the Hexi Corridor of Gansu, where his son, Jizhu, made a skull cup out of the Yuezhi king. Modu also retook the original homeland of Xiongnu on the Yellow River, which had previously been taken by the Qin general Meng Tian. Under Modu's leadership, the Xiongnu became so strong that they began to threaten the Han dynasty.

In 200 BC, Modu besieged the Chinese Han Dynasty emperor Gaozu (Gao-Di) with his 320,000-strong army at Peteng Fortress in Baideng (present-day Datong, Shanxi) almost causing Emperor Gaozu, the first Han emperor, to lose his throne in 200 BC. Gaozu (Gao-Di) after agreed to all Modu's terms, such as ceding the northern provinces to the Xiongnu and paying annual taxes, he was allowed to leave the siege. Although Gaozu was able to return to his capital Chang'an (present-day Xi'an), Modu occasionally threatened the Han's northern frontier and finally in 198 BC, a peace treaty was finally settled.

Xiongnu in their expansion drove their western neighbour Yuezhi from the Hexi Corridor in year 176 BC, killing the Yuezhi king and asserting their presence in the Western Regions.

By the time of Modu's death in 174 BC, the Xiongnu were recognized as the most prominent of the nomads bordering the Chinese Han empire 
According to the Book of Han, later quoted in Duan Chengshi's ninth-century Miscellaneous Morsels from Youyang:

Xiongnu hierarchy 

The ruler of the Xiongnu was called the Chanyu. Under him were the Tuqi Kings. The Tuqi King of the Left was normally the heir presumptive. Next lower in the hierarchy came more officials in pairs of left and right: the guli, the army commanders, the great governors, the danghu and the gudu. Beneath them came the commanders of detachments of one thousand, of one hundred, and of ten men. This nation of nomads, a people on the march, was organized like an army.

After Modu, later leaders formed a dualistic system of political organisation with the left and right branches of the Xiongnu divided on a regional basis. The chanyu or shanyu, a ruler equivalent to the Emperor of China, exercised direct authority over the central territory. Longcheng (龍城) became the annual meeting place and served as the Xiongnu capital. The ruins of Longcheng were found south of Ulziit District, Arkhangai Province in 2017.

North of Shanxi with the Tuqi King of the Left was holding the area north of Beijing and the Tuqi King of the Right was holding the Ordos Loop area as far as Gansu.
When the Xiongnu had been driven north, to today's Mongolia.

Marriage diplomacy with Han China 

In the winter of 200 BC, following a Xiongnu siege of Taiyuan, Emperor Gaozu of Han personally led a military campaign against Modu Chanyu. At the Battle of Baideng, he was ambushed, reputedly by Xiongnu cavalry. The emperor was cut off from supplies and reinforcements for seven days, only narrowly escaping capture.

The Han dynasty sent random unrelated commoner women falsely labeled as "princesses" and members of the Han imperial family multiple times when they were practicing Heqin marriage alliances with the Xiongnu in order to avoid sending the emperor's daughters. The Han sent these "princesses" to marry Xiongnu leaders in their efforts to stop the border raids. Along with arranged marriages, the Han sent gifts to bribe the Xiongnu to stop attacking. After the defeat at Pingcheng in 200 BC, the Han emperor abandoned a military solution to the Xiongnu threat. Instead, in 198 BC, the courtier  was dispatched for negotiations. The peace settlement eventually reached between the parties included a Han princess given in marriage to the chanyu (called heqin); periodic gifts to the Xiongnu of silk, distilled beverages and rice; equal status between the states; and a boundary wall as mutual border.

This first treaty set the pattern for relations between the Han and the Xiongnu for sixty years. Up to 135 BC, the treaty was renewed nine times, each time with an increase in the "gifts" to the Xiongnu Empire. In 192 BC, Modun even asked for the hand of Emperor Gaozu of Han widow Empress Lü Zhi. His son and successor, the energetic Jiyu, known as the Laoshang Chanyu, continued his father's expansionist policies. Laoshang succeeded in negotiating with Emperor Wen terms for the maintenance of a large scale government sponsored market system.

While the Xiongnu benefited handsomely, from the Chinese perspective marriage treaties were costly, very humiliating and ineffective. Laoshang Chanyu showed that he did not take the peace treaty seriously. On one occasion his scouts penetrated to a point near Chang'an. In 166 BC he personally led 140,000 cavalry to invade Anding, reaching as far as the imperial retreat at Yong. In 158 BC, his successor sent 30,000 cavalry to attack Shangdang and another 30,000 to Yunzhong.

The Xiongnu also practiced marriage alliances with Han dynasty officers and officials who defected to their side by marrying off sisters and daughters of the Chanyu (the Xiongnu ruler) to Han Chinese who joined the Xiongnu and Xiongnu in Han service. The daughter of the Laoshang Chanyu (and older sister of Junchen Chanyu and Yizhixie Chanyu) was married to the Xiongnu General Zhao Xin, the Marquis of Xi who was serving the Han dynasty. The daughter of Qiedihou Chanyu was married to the Han Chinese General Li Ling after he surrendered and defected. Another Han Chinese General who defected to the Xiongnu was Li Guangli, general in the War of the Heavenly Horses, who also married a daughter of the Hulugu Chanyu. The Han Chinese diplomat Su Wu married a Xiongnu woman given by Li Ling when he was arrested and taken captive. Han Chinese explorer Zhang Qian married a Xiongnu woman and had a child with her when he was taken captive by the Xiongnu.

When the Eastern Jin dynasty ended, the Xianbei Northern Wei received the Han Chinese Jin prince Sima Chuzhi 司馬楚之 as a refugee. A Northern Wei Xianbei Princess married Sima Chuzhi, giving birth to Sima Jinlong 司馬金龍. Northern Liang Xiongnu King Juqu Mujian's daughter married Sima Jinlong.

The Yenisei Kyrgyz khagans of the Yenisei Kyrgyz Khaganate claimed descent from the Chinese general Li Ling, grandson of the famous Han dynasty general Li Guang. Li Ling was captured by the Xiongnu and defected in the first century BCE. And since the Tang royal Li family also claimed descent from Li Guang, the Kirghiz Khagan was therefore recognized as a member of the Tang Imperial family. This relationship soothed the relationship when Kyrgyz khagan Are (阿熱) invaded Uyghur Khaganate and put Qasar Qaghan to the sword. The news brought to Chang'an by Kyrgyz ambassador Zhuwu Hesu (註吾合素).

Han–Xiongnu war 

The Han dynasty made preparations for war when the Han Emperor Wu dispatched the Han Chinese explorer Zhang Qian to explore the mysterious kingdoms to the west and to form an alliance with the Yuezhi people in order to combat the Xiongnu. During this time Zhang married a Xiongnu wife, who bore him a son, and gained the trust of the Xiongnu leader. While Zhang Qian did not succeed in this mission, his reports of the west provided even greater incentive to counter the Xiongnu hold on westward routes out of the Han Empire, and the Han prepared to mount a large scale attack using the Northern Silk Road to move men and material.

While the Han dynasty was making preparations for a military confrontation since the reign of Emperor Wen, the break did not come until 133 BC, following an abortive trap to ambush the chanyu at Mayi. By that point the empire was consolidated politically, militarily and economically, and was led by an adventurous pro-war faction at court. In that year, Emperor Wu reversed the decision he had made the year before to renew the peace treaty.

Full-scale war broke out in autumn 129 BC, when 40,000 Han cavalry made a surprise attack on the Xiongnu at the border markets. In 127 BC, the Han general Wei Qing retook the Ordos. In 121 BC, the Xiongnu suffered another setback when Huo Qubing led a force of light cavalry westward out of Longxi and within six days fought his way through five Xiongnu kingdoms. The Xiongnu Hunye king was forced to surrender with 40,000 men. In 119 BC both Huo and Wei, each leading 50,000 cavalrymen and 100,000 footsoldiers (in order to keep up with the mobility of the Xiongnu, many of the non-cavalry Han soldiers were mobile infantrymen who traveled on horseback but fought on foot), and advancing along different routes, forced the chanyu and his Xiongnu court to flee north of the Gobi Desert. Major logistical difficulties limited the duration and long-term continuation of these campaigns. According to the analysis of Yan You (嚴尤), the difficulties were twofold. Firstly there was the problem of supplying food across long distances. Secondly, the weather in the northern Xiongnu lands was difficult for Han soldiers, who could never carry enough fuel. According to official reports, the Xiongnu lost 80,000 to 90,000 men, and out of the 140,000 horses the Han forces had brought into the desert, fewer than 30,000 returned to the Han Empire.

In 104 and 102 BC, the Han fought and won the War of the Heavenly Horses against the Kingdom of Dayuan. As a result, the Han gained many Ferghana horses which further aided them in their battle against the Xiongnu. As a result of these battles, the Han Empire controlled the strategic region from the Ordos and Gansu corridor to Lop Nor. They succeeded in separating the Xiongnu from the Qiang peoples to the south, and also gained direct access to the Western Regions. Because of strong Han control over the Xiongnu, the Xiongnu became unstable and were no longer a threat to the Han Empire.

Ban Chao, Protector General (都護; Duhu) of the Han dynasty, embarked with an army of 70,000 soldiers in a campaign against the Xiongnu remnants who were harassing the trade route now known as the Silk Road. His successful military campaign saw the subjugation of one Xiongnu tribe after another. Ban Chao also sent an envoy named Gan Ying to Daqin (Rome). Ban Chao was created the Marquess of Dingyuan (定遠侯, i.e., "the Marquess who stabilized faraway places") for his services to the Han Empire and returned to the capital Luoyang at the age of 70 years and died there in the year 102. Following his death, the power of the Xiongnu in the Western Regions increased again, and the emperors of subsequent dynasties did not reach as far west until the Tang dynasty.

Xiongnu Civil War (60–53 BC) 
When a Chanyu died, power could pass to his younger brother if his son was not of age. This system, which can be compared to Gaelic tanistry, normally kept an adult male on the throne, but could cause trouble in later generations when there were several lineages that might claim the throne. When the 12th Chanyu died in 60 BC, power was taken by Woyanqudi, a grandson of the 12th Chanyu's cousin. Being something of a usurper, he tried to put his own men in power, which only increased the number of his enemies. The 12th Chanyu's son fled east and, in 58 BC, revolted. Few would support Woyanqudi and he was driven to suicide, leaving the rebel son, Huhanye, as the 14th Chanyu. The Woyanqudi faction then set up his brother, Tuqi, as Chanyu (58 BC). In 57 BC three more men declared themselves Chanyu. Two dropped their claims in favor of the third who was defeated by Tuqi in that year and surrendered to Huhanye the following year. In 56 BC Tuqi was defeated by Huhanye and committed suicide, but two more claimants appeared: Runzhen and Huhanye's elder brother Zhizhi Chanyu. Runzhen was killed by Zhizhi in 54 BC, leaving only Zhizhi and Huhanye. Zhizhi grew in power, and, in 53 BC, Huhanye moved south and submitted to the Chinese. Huhanye used Chinese support to weaken Zhizhi, who gradually moved west. In 49 BC, a brother to Tuqi set himself up as Chanyu and was killed by Zhizhi. In 36 BC, Zhizhi was killed by a Chinese army while trying to establish a new kingdom in the far west near Lake Balkhash.

Tributary relations with the Han 

In 53 BC Huhanye (呼韓邪) decided to enter into tributary relations with Han China. The original terms insisted on by the Han court were that, first, the Chanyu or his representatives should come to the capital to pay homage; secondly, the Chanyu should send a hostage prince; and thirdly, the Chanyu should present tribute to the Han emperor. The political status of the Xiongnu in the Chinese world order was reduced from that of a "brotherly state" to that of an "outer vassal" (外臣). During this period, however, the Xiongnu maintained political sovereignty and full territorial integrity. The Great Wall of China continued to serve as the line of demarcation between Han and Xiongnu.

Huhanye sent his son, the "wise king of the right" Shuloujutang, to the Han court as hostage. In 51 BC he personally visited Chang'an to pay homage to the emperor on the Lunar New Year. In the same year, another envoy Qijushan (稽居狦) was received at the Ganquan Palace in the north-west of modern Shanxi. On the financial side, Huhanye was amply rewarded in large quantities of gold, cash, clothes, silk, horses and grain for his participation. Huhanye made two further homage trips, in 49 BC and 33 BC; with each one the imperial gifts were increased. On the last trip, Huhanye took the opportunity to ask to be allowed to become an imperial son-in-law. As a sign of the decline in the political status of the Xiongnu, Emperor Yuan refused, giving him instead five ladies-in-waiting. One of them was Wang Zhaojun, famed in Chinese folklore as one of the Four Beauties.

When Zhizhi learned of his brother's submission, he also sent a son to the Han court as hostage in 53 BC. Then twice, in 51 BC and 50 BC, he sent envoys to the Han court with tribute. But having failed to pay homage personally, he was never admitted to the tributary system. In 36 BC, a junior officer named Chen Tang, with the help of Gan Yanshou, protector-general of the Western Regions, assembled an expeditionary force that defeated him at the Battle of Zhizhi and sent his head as a trophy to Chang'an.

Tributary relations were discontinued during the reign of Huduershi (18 AD–48), corresponding to the political upheavals of the Xin Dynasty. The Xiongnu took the opportunity to regain control of the western regions, as well as neighboring peoples such as the Wuhuan. In 24 AD, Hudershi even talked about reversing the tributary system.

Southern Xiongnu and Northern Xiongnu 

The Xiongnu's new power was met with a policy of appeasement by Emperor Guangwu. At the height of his power, Huduershi even compared himself to his illustrious ancestor, Modu. Due to growing regionalism among the Xiongnu, however, Huduershi was never able to establish unquestioned authority. In contravention of a principle of fraternal succession established by Huhanye, Huduershi designated his son Punu as heir-apparent. However, as the eldest son of the preceding chanyu, Bi (Pi)—the Rizhu King of the Right—had a more legitimate claim. Consequently, Bi refused to attend the annual meeting at the chanyus court. Nevertheless, in 46 AD, Punu ascended the throne.

In 48 AD, a confederation of eight Xiongnu tribes in Bi's power base in the south, with a military force totalling 40,000 to 50,000 men, seceded from Punu's kingdom and acclaimed Bi as chanyu. This kingdom became known as the Southern Xiongnu.

Northern Xiongnu 

The rump kingdom under Punu, around the Orkhon (modern north central Mongolia) became known as the Northern Xiongnu. Punu, who became known as the Northern Chanyu, began to put military pressure on the Southern Xiongnu.

In 49 AD, Tsi Yung, a Han governor of Liaodong, allied with the Wuhuan and Xianbei, attacked the Northern Xiongnu. The Northern Xiongnu suffered two major defeats: one at the hands of the Xianbei in 85 AD, and by the Han during the Battle of Ikh Bayan, in 89 AD. The northern chanyu fled to the north-west with his subjects.

In about 155 AD, the Northern Xiongnu were decisively "crushed and subjugated" by the Xianbei.

According to the fifth-century Book of Wei, the remnants of Northern Chanyu's tribe settled as Yueban (悅般), near Kucha and subjugated the Wusun; while the rest fled across the Altai mountains towards Kangju in Transoxania. It states that this group later became the Hephthalites.

Southern Xiongnu 

Coincidentally, the Southern Xiongnu were plagued by natural disasters and misfortunes—in addition to the threat posed by Punu. Consequently, in 50 AD, the Southern Xiongnu submitted to tributary relations with Han China. The system of tribute was considerably tightened by the Han, to keep the Southern Xiongnu under control. The chanyu was ordered to establish his court in the Meiji district of Xihe Commandery and the Southern Xiongnu were resettled in eight frontier commanderies. At the same time, large numbers of Chinese were also resettled in these commanderies, in mixed Han-Xiongnu settlements. Economically, the Southern Xiongnu became reliant on trade with the Han.

Tensions were evident between Han settlers and practitioners of the nomadic way of life. Thus, in 94, Anguo Chanyu joined forces with newly subjugated Xiongnu from the north and started a large scale rebellion against the Han.

During the late 2nd century AD, the southern Xiongnu were drawn into the rebellions then plaguing the Han court. In 188, the chanyu was murdered by some of his own subjects for agreeing to send troops to help the Han suppress a rebellion in Hebei—many of the Xiongnu feared that it would set a precedent for unending military service to the Han court. The murdered chanyu's son Yufuluo, entitled Chizhisizhu, succeeded him, but was then overthrown by the same rebellious faction in 189. He travelled to Luoyang (the Han capital) to seek aid from the Han court, but at this time the Han court was in disorder from the clash between Grand General He Jin and the eunuchs, and the intervention of the warlord Dong Zhuo. The chanyu had no choice but to settle down with his followers in Pingyang, a city in Shanxi. In 195, he died and was succeeded as chanyu by his brother Huchuquan Chanyu.

In 215–216 AD, the warlord-statesman Cao Cao detained Huchuquan Chanyu in the city of Ye, and divided his followers in Shanxi into five divisions: left, right, south, north and centre. This was aimed at preventing the exiled Xiongnu in Shanxi from engaging in rebellion, and also allowed Cao Cao to use the Xiongnu as auxiliaries in his cavalry.

Later the Xiongnu aristocracy in Shanxi changed their surname from Luanti to Liu for prestige reasons, claiming that they were related to the Han imperial clan through the old intermarriage policy. After Huchuquan, the Southern Xiongnu were partitioned into five local tribes. Each local chief was under the "surveillance of a chinese resident", while the shanyu was in "semicaptivity at the imperial court."

Later Xiongnu states in northern China 
The Southern Xiongnu that settled in northern China during the Eastern Han dynasty retained their tribal affiliation and political organization and played an active role in Chinese politics. During the Sixteen Kingdoms (304–439 CE), Southern Xiongnu leaders founded or ruled several kingdoms, including Liu Yuan's Han Zhao Kingdom (also known as Former Zhao), Helian Bobo's Xia and Juqu Mengxun's Northern Liang

Fang Xuanling's Book of Jin lists nineteen Xiongnu tribes: Tuge (屠各), Xianzhi (鮮支), Koutou (寇頭), Wutan (烏譚), Chile (赤勒), Hanzhi (捍蛭), Heilang (黑狼), Chisha (赤沙), Yugang (鬱鞞), Weisuo (萎莎), Tutong (禿童), Bomie (勃蔑), Qiangqu (羌渠), Helai (賀賴), Zhongqin (鐘跂), Dalou (大樓), Yongqu (雍屈), Zhenshu (真樹) and Lijie (力羯).

Han Zhao dynasty (304–329) 

In 304, Liu Yuan became Chanyu of the Five Hordes. In 308, declared himself emperor and founded the Han Zhao Dynasty. In 311, his son and successor Liu Cong captured Luoyang, and with it the Emperor Huai of Jin China.

In 316, the Emperor Min of Jin China was captured in Chang'an. Both emperors were humiliated as cupbearers in Linfen before being executed in 313 and 318.

North China came under Xiongnu rule while the remnants of the Jin dynasty survived in the south at Jiankang.

Reign of Liu Yao (318–329)
In 318, after suppressing a coup by a powerful minister in the Xiongnu-Han court, in which the emperor and a large proportion of the aristocracy were massacred, the Xiongnu prince Liu Yao moved the Xiongnu-Han capital from Pingyang to Chang'an and renamed the dynasty as Zhao. Liu Yuan had declared the empire's name Han to create a linkage with Han Dynasty—to which he claimed he was a descendant, through a princess, but Liu Yao felt that it was time to end the linkage with Han and explicitly restore the linkage to the great Xiongnu chanyu Maodun, and therefore decided to change the name of the state. (However, this was not a break from Liu Yuan, as he continued to honor Liu Yuan and Liu Cong posthumously; it is hence known to historians collectively as Han Zhao.)

However, the eastern part of north China came under the control of a rebel Xiongnu-Han general of Jie ancestry named Shi Le. Liu Yao and Shi Le fought a long war until 329, when Liu Yao was captured in battle and executed. Chang'an fell to Shi Le soon after, and the Xiongnu dynasty was wiped out. North China was ruled by Shi Le's Later Zhao dynasty for the next 20 years.

However, the "Liu" Xiongnu remained active in the north for at least another century.

Tiefu tribe and Hu Xia dynasty (260–431) 
The northern Tiefu branch of the Xiongnu gained control of what is modern-day Inner Mongolia in the 10 years between the conquest of the Xianbei-ruled state of Dai by the Former Qin dynasty in 376, and its restoration in 386 as the Northern Wei dynasty. After 386, the Tiefu were gradually destroyed by or surrendered to the Tuoba, with the submitting Tiefu becoming known as the Dugu. Liu Bobo, a surviving prince of the Tiefu fled to the Ordos Loop, where he founded a state called the Hu Xia dynasty (thus named because of the Xiongnu's supposed ancestry from the Xia dynasty) and changed his surname to Helian (赫連). The Hu Xia dynasty was conquered by the Northern Wei in 428–31, and the Xiongnu thenceforth effectively ceased to play a major role in Chinese history, assimilating into the Xianbei and Han ethnicities.

Tongwancheng (meaning "Unite All Nations") was the capital of the Hu Xia, whose rulers claimed descent from Modu Chanyu.

The ruined city was discovered in 1996 and the State Council designated it as a cultural relic under top state protection. The repair of the Yong'an Platform, where Helian Bobo, emperor of the Da Xia regime, reviewed parading troops, has been finished and restoration on the 31-meter-tall turret follows.

Juqu clan and Northern Liang dynasty (401–460) 
The Juqu clan was of Lushuihu origin, a branch of the Xiongnu. Their leader Juqu Mengxun took over the Northern Liang dynasty by overthrowing the former puppet ruler Duan Ye. By 439, the Juqu power was destroyed by the Northern Wei dynasty. Their remnants were then settled in the city of Gaochang before being destroyed by the Rouran.

Significance 
The Xiongnu confederation was unusually long-lived for a steppe empire. The purpose of raiding the Central Plain was not simply for goods, but to force the Central Plain polity to pay regular tribute. The power of the Xiongnu ruler was based on his control of Han tribute which he used to reward his supporters. The Han and Xiongnu empires rose at the same time because the Xiongnu state depended on Han tribute. A major Xiongnu weakness was the custom of lateral succession. If a dead ruler's son was not old enough to take command, power passed to the late ruler's brother. This worked in the first generation but could lead to civil war in the second generation. The first time this happened, in 60 BC, the weaker party adopted what Barfield calls the 'inner frontier strategy.' They moved south and submitted to the dominant Central Plain regime and then used the resources obtained from their overlord to defeat the Northern Xiongnu and re-establish the empire. The second time this happened, about 47 AD, the strategy failed. The southern ruler was unable to defeat the northern ruler and the Xiongnu remained divided.

Ethnolinguistic origins 

There are several theories on the ethnolinguistic identity of the Xiongnu.

Proposed link to the Huns 

The Xiongnu-Hun hypothesis was originally proposed by the 18th-century French historian Joseph de Guignes, who noticed that ancient Chinese scholars had referred to members of tribes which were associated with the Xiongnu by names which were similar to the name "Hun", albeit with varying Chinese characters. Étienne de la Vaissière has shown that, in the Sogdian script used in the so-called "Sogdian Ancient Letters", both the Xiongnu and the Huns were referred to as the γwn (xwn), which indicates that the two names were synonymous. Although the theory that the Xiongnu were the precursors of the Huns as they were later known in Europe is now accepted by many scholars, it has yet to become a consensus view. The identification with the Huns may either be incorrect or it may be an oversimplification (as would appear to be the case with a proto-Mongol people, the Rouran, who have sometimes been linked to the Avars of Central Europe).

Iranian theories 

There is a general consensus among scholars that the Xiongnu elite were originally Iranian. Harold Walter Bailey proposed an Iranian origin of the Xiongnu, recognizing all of the earliest Xiongnu names of the 2nd century BC as being of the Iranian type. Central Asian scholar Christopher I. Beckwith notes that the Xiongnu name could be a cognate of Scythian, Saka and Sogdia, corresponding to a name for Northern Iranians. According to Beckwith the Xiongnu could have contained a leading Iranian component when they started out, but more likely they had earlier been subjects of an Iranian people and learned the Iranian nomadic model from them.

In the 1994 UNESCO-published History of Civilizations of Central Asia, its editor János Harmatta claims that the royal tribes and kings of the Xiongnu bore Iranian names, that all Xiongnu words noted by the Chinese can be explained from a Scythian language, and that it is therefore clear that the majority of Xiongnu tribes spoke an Eastern Iranian language.

According to a study by Alexander Savelyev and Choongwon Jeong, published in 2020 in the journal Evolutionary Human Sciences by Cambridge University Press, "The predominant part of the Xiongnu population is likely to have spoken Turkic". However, important cultural, technological and genetic contributions of Iranian-speakers to the Xiongnu culture were also mentioned. According to various studies compiled by these authors, 18% of Xiongnu ancestry was closely related to individuals from the BMAC population of Gonur Depe, which is common in modern day people from Iran. An additional ~22% of the Xiongnu's West Eurasian ancestry was linked to the Sintashta culture. The rest of the Xiongnu ancestry (~58%) was represented by the late bronze age East Eurasian Khovsgol population.

Yeniseian theories 

Lajos Ligeti was the first to suggest that the Xiongnu spoke a Yeniseian language. In the early 1960s Edwin Pulleyblank was the first to expand upon this idea with credible evidence. The Yeniseian theory proposes that the Jie, a western Xiongnu people, spoke a Yeniseian language. Hyun Jin Kim notes that the 7th AD Chinese conpendium, Jin Shu, contains a transliterated song of Jie origin, which appears to be Yeniseian. This song has led researchers Pulleyblank and Vovin to argue for a Yeniseian Jie dominant minority, that ruled over the other Xiongnu ethnicities, like Iranian and Turkic people. Kim has stated that the dominant Xiongnu language was likely Turkic or Yeniseian, but has cautioned that the Xiongnu were definitely a multi-ethnic society.

Pulleybank and D. N. Keightley asserted that the Xiongnu titles "were originally Siberian words but were later borrowed by the Turkic and Mongolic peoples". Titles such as tarqan, tegin and kaghan were also inherited from the Xiongnu language and are possibly of Yeniseian origin. For example, the Xiongnu word for "heaven" is theorized to come from Proto-Yeniseian tɨŋVr.

Vocabulary from Xiongnu inscriptions sometimes appears to have Yeniseian cognates, such as Xiongnu kʷala 'son' and Ket qalek 'younger son', Xiongnu sakdak 'boot' appears to be similar to Ket sagdi 'boot' and Xiongnu gʷawa "prince" and Ket gij "prince" or Xiongnu dar "north" and Yugh tɨr "north". Pulleyblank also argued that because Xiongnu words appear to have clusters with r and l, in the beginning of the word it is unlikely to be of Turkic origin, and instead believed that most vocabulary we have mostly resemble Yeniseian languages.

Alexander Vovin also wrote, that some names of horses in the Xiongnu language appear to be Turkic words with Yeniseian prefixes.

An analysis by Savalyev and Jeong has cast doubt on the Yeniseian theory. The Xiongnu were characterized by a genetic affinity to Iranian speakers, which is lacking in modern-day Yeniseian speakers such as Kets, who are more genetically similar to Samoyedic speakers than to Xiongnu individuals and other Iron Age Siberians.

Turkic theories 

According to a study by Alexander Savelyev and Choongwon Jeong, published in 2020 in the journal Evolutionary Human Sciences by Cambridge University Press, "The predominant part of the Xiongnu population is likely to have spoken Turkic". However, genetic studies found a mixture of haplogroups from western and eastern Eurasian origins that suggested a large genetic diversity within, and possibly multiple origins of Xiongnu elites. The Turkic-related component may be brought by eastern Eurasian genetic substratum.

Other proponents of a Turkic language theory include E.H. Parker, Jean-Pierre Abel-Rémusat, Julius Klaproth, Gustaf John Ramstedt, Annemarie von Gabain,, and Charles Hucker. André Wink states that the Xiongnu probably spoke an early form of Turkic; even if Xiongnu were not "Turks" nor Turkic-speaking, they were in close contact with Turkic-speakers very early on. Craig Benjamin sees the Xiongnu as either proto-Turks or proto-Mongols who possibly spoke a language related to the Dingling.

Chinese sources link several Turkic peoples to the Xiongnu: 
 According to the Book of Zhou, History of Northern Dynasties, Tongdian, New Book of Tang, the Göktürks and the ruling Ashina clan was a component of the Xiongnu confederation, 
 However, the Ashina-surnamed Göktürks were also stated to be they were "mixed barbarians" (záhú) who fled from Pingliang (now in modern Gansu province, China). or from an obscure Suo state (索國), north of the Xiongnu.
 Uyghur Khagans claimed descent from the Xiongnu (according to Chinese history Weishu, the founder of the Uyghur Khaganate was descended from a Xiongnu ruler).
 Book of Wei states that the Yueban descended from remnants of the Northern Xiongnu chanyu's tribe and that Yueban's language and customs resembled Gaoche (高車), another name of the Tiele.
 Book of Jin lists 19 southern Xiongnu tribes who entered Former Yan's borders, the 14th being the Alat (Ch. 賀賴 Helai ~ 賀蘭 Helan ~ 曷剌 Hela); Alat being glossed "piebald horse" (Ch. 駁馬 ~ 駮馬 Boma) in Old Turkic.

However, Chinese sources also ascribe Xiongnu origins to the Para-Mongolic-speaking Kumo Xi and Khitans.

Mongolic theories 

Mongolian and other scholars have suggested that the Xiongnu spoke a language related to the Mongolic languages. Mongolian archaeologists proposed that the Slab Grave Culture people were the ancestors of the Xiongnu, and some scholars have suggested that the Xiongnu may have been the ancestors of the Mongols. Nikita Bichurin considered Xiongnu and Xianbei to be two subgroups (or dynasties) of but one same ethnicity.

According to the "Book of Song", the Rourans, whom Book of Wei identified as offspring of Proto-Mongolic Donghu people, possessed the alternative name(s) 大檀 Dàtán "Tatar" and/or 檀檀 Tántán "Tartar" and according to Book of Liang, "they also constituted a separate branch of the Xiongnu". Old Book of Tang mentioned  twenty Shiwei tribes, whom other Chinese sources (Book of Sui, New Book of Tang) associated with the Khitans, another people who in turn descended from the Xianbei and were also associated with the Xiongnu.  While the Xianbei, Khitans, and Shiwei are generally believed to be predominantly Mongolic- and Para-Mongolic-speaking, yet Xianbei were stated to descend from the Donghu, whom Sima Qian distinguished from the Xiongnu. (notwithstanding Sima Qian's inconsistency). Additionally, Chinese chroniclers routinely ascribed Xiongnu origins to various nomadic groups: for examples, Xiongnu ancestry was ascribed to Para-Mongolic-speaking Kumo Xi as well as Turkic-speaking Göktürks and Tiele;

Genghis Khan refers to the time of Modu Chanyu as "the remote times of our Chanyu" in his letter to Daoist Qiu Chuji. Sun and moon symbol of Xiongnu that discovered by archaeologists is similar to Mongolian Soyombo symbol.

Multiple ethnicities 

Since the early 19th century, a number of Western scholars have proposed a connection between various language families or subfamilies and the language or languages of the Xiongnu. Albert Terrien de Lacouperie considered them to be multi-component groups. Many scholars believe the Xiongnu confederation was a mixture of different ethno-linguistic groups, and that their main language (as represented in the Chinese sources) and its relationships have not yet been satisfactorily determined. Kim rejects "old racial theories or even ethnic affiliations" in favour of the "historical reality of these extensive, multiethnic, polyglot steppe empires".

Chinese sources link the Tiele people and Ashina to the Xiongnu, not all Turkic peoples. According to the Book of Zhou and the History of the Northern Dynasties, the Ashina clan was a component of the Xiongnu confederation, but this connection is disputed, and according to the Book of Sui and the Tongdian, they were "mixed nomads" from Pingliang. The Ashina and Tiele may have been separate ethnic groups who mixed with the Xiongnu. Indeed, Chinese sources link many nomadic peoples (hu; see Wu Hu) on their northern borders to the Xiongnu, just as Greco-Roman historiographers called Avars and Huns "Scythians". The Greek cognate of Tourkia was used by the Byzantine emperor and scholar Constantine VII Porphyrogenitus in his book De Administrando Imperio, though in his use, "Turks" always referred to Magyars. Such archaizing was a common literary topos, and implied similar geographic origins and nomadic lifestyle but not direct filiation.

Some Uyghurs claimed descent from the Xiongnu (according to Chinese history Weishu, the founder of the Uyghur Khaganate was descended from a Xiongnu ruler), but many contemporary scholars do not consider the modern Uyghurs to be of direct linear descent from the old Uyghur Khaganate because modern Uyghur language and Old Uyghur languages are different. Rather, they consider them to be descendants of a number of people, one of them the ancient Uyghurs.

In various kinds of ancient inscriptions on monuments of Munmu of Silla, it is recorded that King Munmu had Xiongnu ancestry. According to several historians, it is possible that there were tribes of Koreanic origin. There are also some Korean researchers that point out that the grave goods of Silla and of the eastern Xiongnu are alike.

Language isolate theories 
Turkologist Gerhard Doerfer has denied any possibility of a relationship between the Xiongnu language and any other known language, even any connection with Turkic or Mongolian.

Geographic origins 
The original geographic location of the Xiongnu is disputed among steppe archaeologists. Since the 1960s, the geographic origin of the Xiongnu has attempted to be traced through an analysis of Early Iron Age burial constructions. No region has been proven to have mortuary practices that clearly match those of the Xiongnu.

Archaeology 

In the 1920s, Pyotr Kozlov's oversaw the excavation of royal tombs at the Noin-Ula burial site in northern Mongolia, dated to around the first century CE. Other Xiongnu sites have been unearthed in Inner Mongolia, such as the Ordos culture. Sinologist Otto Maenchen-Helfen has said that depictions of the Xiongnu of Transbaikalia and the Ordos show commonly show individuals with West Eurasian features. Iaroslav Lebedynsky said that West Eurasian depictions in the Ordos region should be attributed to a "Scythian affinity".

Portraits found in the Noin-Ula excavations demonstrate other cultural evidences and influences, showing that Chinese and Xiongnu art have influenced each other mutually. Some of these embroidered portraits in the Noin-Ula kurgans also depict the Xiongnu with long braided hair with wide ribbons, which is seen to be identical with the Ashina clan hair-style. Well-preserved bodies in Xiongnu and pre-Xiongnu tombs in the Mongolian Republic and southern Siberia show both East Asian and West Eurasian features.

Analysis of cranial remains from some sites attributed to the Xiongnu have revealed that they had dolichocephalic skulls with East Asian craniometrical features, setting them apart from neighboring populations in present-day Mongolia. Russian and Chinese anthropological and craniofacial studies show that the Xiongnu were physically very heterogenous, with six different population clusters showing different degrees of West Eurasian and East Asian physical traits.

Presently, there exist four fully excavated and well documented cemeteries: Ivolga, Dyrestui, Burkhan Tolgoi, and Daodunzi. Additionally thousands of tombs have been recorded in Transbaikalia and Mongolia.

The archaeologists have chosen to, for the most part, refrain from positing anything about Han-Xiongnu relations based on the material excavated. However, they were willing to mention the following: "There is no clear indication of the ethnicity of this tomb occupant, but in a similar brick-chambered tomb of the late Eastern Han period at the same cemetery, archaeologists discovered a bronze seal with the official title that the Han government bestowed upon the leader of the Xiongnu. The excavators suggested that these brick chamber tombs all belong to the Xiongnu (Qinghai 1993)."Classifications of these burial sites make distinction between two prevailing type of burials: "(1) monumental ramped terrace tombs which are often flanked by smaller "satellite" burials and (2) 'circular' or 'ring' burials." Some scholars consider this a division between "elite" graves and "commoner" graves. Other scholars, find this division too simplistic and not evocative of a true distinction because it shows "ignorance of the nature of the mortuary investments and typically luxuriant burial assemblages [and does not account for] the discovery of other lesser interments that do not qualify as either of these types."

Genetics

Maternal lineages

A 2003 study found that 89% of Xiongnu maternal lineages are of East Asian origin, while 11% were of West Eurasian origin. However, a 2016 study found that 37.5% of Xiongnu maternal lineages were West Eurasian, in a central Mongolian sample.

According to Rogers & Kaestle (2022),  these studies make clear that the Xiongnu population is extremely similar to the preceding Slab Grave population, which had a similar frequency of Eastern and Western maternal haplogroups, supporting a hypothesis of continuity from the Slab Grave period to the Xiongnu. They wrote that the bulk of the genetics research indicates that roughly 27% of Xiongnu maternal haplogroups were of West Eurasian origin, while the rest were East Asian.

Some examples of maternal haplogroups observed in Xiongnu specimens include D4b2b4, N9a2a, G3a3, D4a6 and D4b2b2b. and U2e1.

Paternal lineages
According to Rogers & Kaestle (2022), roughly 47% of Xiongnu paternal haplogroups were of West Eurasian origin, while the rest were of East Asian origin. They observed that this contrasts strongly with the preceding Slab Grave period, which was dominated by East Asian patrilineages. They suggest that this may reflect an aggressive expansion of people with West Eurasian paternal haplogroups, or perhaps the practice of marriage alliances favoring people with Western patrilines.

Some examples of paternal haplogroups in Xiongnu specimens include Q1b, C3, R1, R1b, O3a and O3a3b2, R1a1a1b2a-Z94, R1a1a1b2a2-Z2124, Q1a and N1a.

Autosomal ancestry

A study published in the American Journal of Physical Anthropology in October 2006 detected significant genetic continuity between the examined individuals at Egyin Gol and modern Mongolians.

A genetic study published in Nature in May 2018 examined the remains of five Xiongnu. The study concluded that Xiongnu confederation was genetically heterogeneous, and Xiongnu individuals belonging to two distinct groups, one being of East Asian origin and the other presenting considerable admixture levels with West Eurasian (possibly from Central Saka) sources. The evidence suggested that the Huns probably emerged through minor male-driven East Asian geneflow into the Saka through westward migrations of the Xiongnu.

A study published in November 2020 examined 60 early and late Xiongnu individuals from across of Mongolia. By admixture they formed three distinct clusters, "early/Xiongnu_west" related to Scythians, "early/Xiongnu_rest" with more Northeastern Asian ancestry and "late/Xiongnu" with high heterogenity having Sarmatian and Han Chinese gene pool influence. Their uniparental haplogroup assignments also showed heterogenetic influence on their ethnogenesis as well as their connection with Huns.

Culture

Art

Within the Xiongnu culture more variety is visible from site to site than from "era" to "era," in terms of the Chinese chronology, yet all form a whole that is distinct from that of the Han and other peoples of the non-Chinese north. In some instances, the iconography cannot be used as the main cultural identifier, because art depicting animal predation is common among the steppe peoples. An example of animal predation associated with Xiongnu culture is that of a tiger carrying dead prey. A similar motif appears in work from Maoqinggou, a site which is presumed to have been under Xiongnu political control but is still clearly non-Xiongnu. In the Maoqinggou example, the prey is replaced with an extension of the tiger's foot. The work also depicts a cruder level of execution; Maoqinggou work was executed in a rounder, less detailed style. In its broadest sense, Xiongnu iconography of animal predation includes examples such as the gold headdress from Aluchaideng and gold earrings with a turquoise and jade inlay discovered in Xigouban, Inner Mongolia.

Xiongnu art is harder to distinguish from Saka or Scythian art. There is a similarity present in stylistic execution, but Xiongnu art and Saka art often differ in terms of iconography. Saka art does not appear to have included predation scenes, especially with dead prey, or same-animal combat. Additionally, Saka art included elements not common to Xiongnu iconography, such as winged, horned horses. The two cultures also used two different kinds of bird heads. Xiongnu depictions of birds tend to have a medium-sized eye and beak, and they are also depicted with ears, while Saka birds have a pronounced eye and beak, and no ears. Some scholars claim these differences are indicative of cultural differences. Scholar Sophia-Karin Psarras suggests that Xiongnu images of animal predation, specifically tiger-and-prey, are spiritual, representative of death and rebirth, and that same-animal combat is representative of the acquisition or maintenance of power.

Rock art and writing 

The rock art of the Yin and Helan Mountains is dated from the 9th millennium BC to the 19th century AD. It consists mainly of engraved signs (petroglyphs) and only minimally of painted images.

Chinese sources indicate that the Xiongnu did not have an ideographic form of writing like Chinese, but in the 2nd century BC, a renegade Chinese dignitary Yue "taught the Shanyu to write official letters to the Chinese court on a wooden tablet 31 cm long, and to use a seal and large-sized folder." The same sources tell that when the Xiongnu noted down something or transmitted a message, they made cuts on a piece of wood ('ke-mu'), and they also mention a "Hu script" (vol. 110). At Noin-Ula and other Xiongnu burial sites in Mongolia and the region north of Lake Baikal, among the objects discovered during excavations conducted between 1924 and 1925 were over 20 carved characters. Most of these characters are either identical or very similar to letters of the Old Turkic alphabet of the Early Middle Ages found on the Eurasian steppes. From this, some specialists conclude that the Xiongnu used a script similar to the ancient Eurasian runiform, and that this alphabet was a basis for later Turkic writing.

Religion and diet 
According to the Book of Han, "the Xiongnu called Heaven (天) 'Chēnglí,' (撐犁)  a Chinese transcription of Tengri. The Xiongnu were a nomadic people. From their lifestyle of herding flocks and their horse-trade with China, it can be concluded that their diet consist mainly of mutton, horse meat and wild geese that were shot down.

See also 
 List of Xiongnu rulers (Chanyus)
 Rulers family tree
 Nomadic empire
 Ethnic groups in Chinese history
 History of the Han Dynasty
 Ban Yong
 Zubu
 List of largest empires
 Ordos culture

Notes

References

Citations

Sources 
 Primary sources
 Ban Gu et al., Book of Han, esp. vol. 94, part 1, part 2.
 Fan Ye et al., Book of the Later Han, esp. vol. 89.
 Sima Qian et al., Records of the Grand Historian, esp. vol. 110.

 Other sources consulted

 
 
 
 
 
 
 
 
  (Proceedings of the First International Conference of Eurasian Archaeology, University of Chicago, May 3–4, 2002.)
 
  (original edition)
  (First paperback edition)
 
 
 
 
 Hall, Mark & Minyaev, Sergey. Chemical Analyses of Xiong-nu Pottery: A Preliminary Study of Exchange and Trade on the Inner Asian Steppes. In: Journal of Archaeological Science (2002) 29, pp. 135–144
 
 
 
 
 
 
 
 
 
 
  Internet Archive
 .
 
 
 
 
 
 
 

 
 
  AuthorHouse.

Further reading 

 Davydova, Anthonina. The Ivolga archaeological complex. Part 1. The Ivolga fortress. In: Archaeological sites of the Xiongnu, vol. 1. St Petersburg, 1995.
 Davydova, Anthonina. The Ivolga archaeological complex. Part 2. The Ivolga cemetery. In: Archaeological sites of the Xiongnu, vol. 2. St Petersburg, 1996.
  Davydova, Anthonina & Minyaev Sergey. The complex of archaeological sites near Dureny village. In: Archaeological sites of the Xiongnu, vol. 5. St Petersburg, 2003.
 Davydova, Anthonina & Minyaev Sergey. The Xiongnu Decorative bronzes. In: Archaeological sites of the Xiongnu, vol. 6. St Petersburg, 2003.
  Helimski, Eugen. "A szamojéd népek vázlatos története" (Short History of the Samoyedic peoples). In: The History of the Finno-Ugric and Samoyedic Peoples. 2000, Eötvös Loránd University, Budapest, Hungary.
  Kiuner (Kjuner, Küner) [Кюнер], N.V. 1961. Китайские известия о народах Южной Сибири, Центральной Азии и Дальнего Востока (Chinese reports about peoples of Southern Siberia, Central Asia, and Far East). Moscow.
  Klyashtorny S.G. [Кляшторный С.Г.] 1964. Древнетюркские рунические памятники как источник по истории Средней Азии. (Ancient Türkic runiform monuments as a source for the history of Central Asia). Moscow: Nauka.
  Kradin , Nikolay. 2002. "Hun Empire". Acad. 2nd ed., updated and added., Moscow: Logos, 
 Kradin, Nikolay. 2005. Social and Economic Structure of the Xiongnu of the Trans-Baikal Region. Archaeology, Ethnology & Anthropology of Eurasia, No 1 (21), p. 79–86.
 Kradin, Nikolay. 2012. New Approaches and Challenges for the Xiongnu Studies. In: Xiongnu and its eastward Neighbours. Seoul, p. 35–51.
  Liu Mau-tsai. 1958. Die chinesischen Nachrichten zur Geschichte der Ost-Türken (T'u-küe). Wiesbaden: Otto Harrassowitz.
 Minyaev, Sergey. On the origin of the Xiongnu // Bulletin of International association for the study of the culture of Central Asia, UNESCO. Moscow, 1985, No. 9.
 Minyaev, Sergey. News of Xiongnu Archaeology // Das Altertum, vol. 35. Berlin, 1989.
 Minyaev, Sergey. "Niche Grave Burials of the Xiong-nu Period in Central Asia", Information Bulletin, Inter-national Association for the Cultures of Central Asia 17 (1990): 91–99.
 Minyaev, Sergey. The excavation of Xiongnu Sites in the Buryatia Republic// Orientations, vol. 26, n. 10, Hong Kong, November 1995.
 Minyaev, Sergey. Les Xiongnu// Dossiers d' archaeologie, # 212. Paris 1996.
 Minyaev, Sergey. Archaeologie des Xiongnu en Russie: nouvelles decouvertes et quelques Problemes. In: Arts Asiatiques, tome 51, Paris, 1996.
  Minyaev, Sergey. Derestuj cemetery. In: Archaeological sites of the Xiongnu, vol. 3. St-Petersburg, 1998.
 Minyaev, Sergey. The origins of the "Geometric Style" in Hsiungnu art // BAR International series 890. London, 2000.
 Minyaev, Sergey. Art and archeology of the Xiongnu: new discoveries in Russia. In: Circle of Iner Asia Art, Newsletter, Issue 14, December 2001, pp. 3–9
  Minyaev, Sergey. The Xiongnu cultural complex: location and chronology. In: Ancient and Middle Age History of Eastern Asia. Vladivostok, 2001, pp. 295–305.
 Miniaev, Sergey & Elikhina, Julia. On the chronology of the Noyon Uul barrows. The Silk Road 7 (2009): 21–30.
 Minyaev, Sergey & Sakharovskaja, Lidya. Investigation of a Xiongnu Royal Tomb in the Tsaraam valley, part 1. In: Newsletters of the Silk Road Foundation, vol. 4, no.1, 2006.
 Minyaev, Sergey & Sakharovskaja, Lidya. Investigation of a Xiongnu Royal Tomb in the Tsaraam valley, part 2. In: Newsletters of the Silk Road Foundation, vol. 5, no.1, 2007.
 Minyaev, Sergey & Smolarsky Phillipe. Art of the Steppes. Brussels, Foundation Richard Liu, 2002.
  Obrusánszky, Borbála. August 2009. Tongwancheng, city of the southern Huns. Transoxiana, August 2009, 14. .
  Petkovski, Elizabet. 2006. Polymorphismes ponctuels de séquence et identification génétique: étude par spectrométrie de masse MALDI-TOF. Strasbourg: Université Louis Pasteur. Dissertation
  Potapov, L.P. 1969. Этнический состав и происхождение алтайцев (Etnicheskii sostav i proiskhozhdenie altaitsev, Ethnic composition and origins of the Altaians). Leningrad: Nauka. Facsimile in Microsoft Word format.
  Potapov, L.P. [Потапов, Л.П.] 1966. Этнионим Теле и Алтайцы. Тюркологический сборник (The ethnonym "Tele" and the Altaians. Turcologica): 233–240. Moscow: Nauka.
  Talko-Gryntsevich, Julian. 1999. Paleo-Ethnology of Trans-Baikal area. In: Archaeological sites of the Xiongnu, vol. 4. St Petersburg.
 Taskin V.S. [Таскин В.С.]. 1984. Материалы по истории древних кочевых народов группы Дунху (Materials on the history of the ancient nomadic peoples of the Dunhu group). Moscow.
 Brosseder, Ursula, and Bryan Miller. Xiongnu Archaeology: Multidisciplinary Perspectives of the First Steppe Empire in Inner Asia. Bonn: Freiburger Graphische Betriebe- Freiburg, 2011.
 
 Hill, John E. (2009) Through the Jade Gate to Rome: A Study of the Silk Routes during the Later Han Dynasty, 1st to 2nd Centuries CE. BookSurge, Charleston, South Carolina. . (Especially pp. 69–74)
 Houle, J. and L.G. Broderick (2011) "Settlement Patterns and Domestic Economy of the Xiongnu in Khanui Valley, Mongolia", 137–152. In Xiongnu Archaeology: Multidisciplinary Perspectives of the First Steppe Empire in Inner Asia.
 
 
 
 
 Yap, Joseph P, (2019). The Western Regions, Xiongnu and Han, from the Shiji, Hanshu and Hou Hanshu.

External links 

 Material Culture presented by University of Washington
 Encyclopedic Archive on Xiongnu
 The Xiongnu Empire
 The Silk Road Volume 4 Number 1
 The Silk Road Volume 9
 Gold Headdress from Aluchaideng
 Belt buckle, Xiongnu type, 3rd–2nd century B.C.
 Videodocumentation: Xiongnu – the burial site of the Hun prince (Mongolia)
 The National Museum of Mongolian History :: Xiongnu

 
3rd-century BC establishments
460 disestablishments
Ancient peoples of China
Han dynasty
Former countries in Chinese history
History of Mongolia
Nomadic groups in Eurasia
States and territories disestablished in the 1st century
States and territories established in the 3rd century BC
Former confederations